Toluono Feti Toluono is a Samoan politician and member of the Legislative Assembly of Samoa.  He was a founding member of the Tautua Samoa Party.

In January 2011 Toluono was prosecuted on charges of theft and fraud relating to an unlawful land transfer.

References

Year of birth missing (living people)
Living people
Members of the Legislative Assembly of Samoa
Tautua Samoa Party politicians